Kids in Love is the second studio album by Norwegian DJ and record producer Kygo, featuring the likes of John Newman, Jason Walker, Oliver Nelson, Bonnie McKee, OneRepublic, Wrabel, The Night Game, James Abrahart and Billy Raffoul. It was released via Sony Music and Ultra Music on 3 November 2017. The album's lead single and title track, "Kids in Love", was released on 20 October 2017.

Background and promotion
In a video Kygo posted on social media on 19 October 2017, he announced that "Kids in Love" is the title of his second studio album, and revealed its release date. He talked about the inspiration behind the album's title, saying: "Being a kid in love is that concept of being super-passionate about someone or something, and I've been super-passionate about playing the piano since I was 6 years old, whenever I make a song or melody that I really like, I feel like a kid in love." After releasing the lead single "Kids in Love", Kygo started releasing songs as promotional singles from the album everyday starting from 27 October 2017. He announced the Kids in Love tour on 30 November 2017, with Gryffin, Blackbear and Seeb as special guests. Kygo told Billboard in an interview that the album was inspired by Michael Jackson, Foo Fighters, Red Hot Chili Peppers, Avicii and Bon Iver. He spoke to Las Vegas Weekly that he is trying to "find sounds from more unknown people that have great ideas" and making recognizable music.

Critical reception

David Rishty of Billboard was positive towards the album, writing that it "mixes a multitude of genres, but manages to encompass a cohesive body of work, which radiates with Kygo's signature sound". Neil Z. Yeung from AllMusic described the album as feeling "more like an EP" due to its short run time, but praised Kygo for taking "stylistic steps outside his comfort zone" which "avoids much of the homogeneity" of his previous "overstuffed" Cloud Nine album. The critic closed the review by writing that the record "brims with feeling and maintains its momentum throughout, providing an extremely uplifting and empowering mix". Mark Mancino of The Nocturnal Times wrote that Kids in Love "presents a matured evolution of the signature tropical sound he's become most known for creating", and dubbed "Permanent" as one of his favourite tracks of 2017, due to its "powerfully-effective lyric and euphoric melodies".

James Shotwell of Substream Magazine criticized the album for its lack of originality and "great emotional impact". He concluded by deeming it "a perfectly enjoyable, largely forgettable release that will help extend the playlists of electronic music fans without altogether turning off any longtime Kygo listeners". Ollie Webber of The Edge similarly noted how, despite the presence of some standout tracks, some songs felt "bland and forgettable" and that the album as a whole "fail[ed] to deliver on the emotional potential of its title".

Track listing

Charts

Weekly charts

Year-end charts

Certifications

References

2017 albums
Kygo albums
Sony Music albums
Ultra Records albums